H-Logic is the fourth studio album by South Korean singer Lee Hyori. It was released on April 12, 2010. The album has 14 tracks, including collaborations with Daesung from Big Bang, Jiyoon from 4Minute, Bekah from After School, Gary from Leessang, and Sangchu from Mighty Mouth. The singer worked also with E-Tribe, the team behind "U-Go-Girl", the lead single from her previous album.

Following the album’s release, seven tracks from the album was revealed to be plagiarized by Bahnus Vacuum. After the controversy, Lee took a temporary hiatus until 2013.

The album sold 31,756 copies in 2010, making it the 46th best-selling Korean album in 2010.
The promotions ended after the outputs of the two singles "Bring It Back" and "How Did We Get".

Release 
Lee’s comeback made their return with their fourth studio album, the titled album was called H-Logic which would be shortly released on April 12, 2010, the album’s showcase would be in it.

Singles

Swing
Lee performed Swing in the music video as their first single with Gary of Leessang.

Chitty Chitty Bang Bang
The music video was released on April 7, 2011, Lee performed her third single at the M Countdown and MBC.

Plagiarism 

Seven of the songs in the album, which were produced by Bahnus, were plagiarized.

Track listing

Charts

Weekly charts

Monthly charts

Year-end charts

Release history

References

External links 
 H-Logic : buy it on iTunes

2010 albums
Lee Hyori albums
Albums involved in plagiarism controversies